In medicine, the terminal drop hypothesis is a hypothesis that a sharp reduction in cognitive capacity in older people is often correlated with impending death, typically within five years.

See also
 Dementia

References

Gerontology